Sir William Guise, 5th Baronet (1737 – 6 April 1783), was a British politician who accompanied Edward Gibbon on his Grand Tour of Italy and sat in the House of Commons between 1770 and 1783.
 
Guise was the son of Sir John Guise, 4th Baronet of Elmore Court and Rendcombe, Gloucestershire and his wife Jane Saunders, daughter of John Saunders of Mongewell, Oxfordshire. He entered Lincoln's Inn and Queen's College, Oxford in 1754 and was awarded MA on 29 October 1759. Between 1763 and 1765 he undertook the Grand Tour when he met Edward Gibbon at Lausanne and accompanied him to Italy  “in great harmony and good humour”. He succeeded his father in the baronetcy in 1769.

In August 1770 Guise was returned unopposed as Member of Parliament for Gloucestershire and held the seat until his death. He is reported to have spoken only twice in Parliament. 

Guise was unmarried and the baronetcy became extinct on his death on 6 April 1783. His estates were inherited by a relative John Guise of Highnam, who was created the first Guise baronet, of Highnam the same year.

References

|-

1737 births
1783 deaths
Alumni of The Queen's College, Oxford
Members of Lincoln's Inn
Members of the Parliament of Great Britain for English constituencies
British MPs 1768–1774
British MPs 1774–1780
British MPs 1780–1784 
Baronets in the Baronetage of England